Moscow City Duma District 35 is one of 45 constituencies in Moscow City Duma. The constituency covers parts of South-Western Moscow since 2014. In 1993-2005 District 35 was based in Zelenograd and parts of Mitino, however, after the number of constituencies was reduced to 15 in 2005, the constituency was eliminated.

Members elected

Election results

2001

|-
! colspan=2 style="background-color:#E9E9E9;text-align:left;vertical-align:top;" |Candidate
! style="background-color:#E9E9E9;text-align:left;vertical-align:top;" |Party
! style="background-color:#E9E9E9;text-align:right;" |Votes
! style="background-color:#E9E9E9;text-align:right;" |%
|-
|style="background-color:"|
|align=left|Zinaida Dragunkina (incumbent)
|align=left|Independent
|
|37.63%
|-
|style="background-color:"|
|align=left|Fyodor Zheleznov
|align=left|Independent
|
|26.94%
|-
|style="background-color:"|
|align=left|Aleksey Nemeryuk
|align=left|Independent
|
|14.88%
|-
|style="background-color:#000000"|
|colspan=2 |against all
|
|17.24%
|-
| colspan="5" style="background-color:#E9E9E9;"|
|- style="font-weight:bold"
| colspan="3" style="text-align:left;" | Total
| 
| 100%
|-
| colspan="5" style="background-color:#E9E9E9;"|
|- style="font-weight:bold"
| colspan="4" |Source:
|
|}

2014

|-
! colspan=2 style="background-color:#E9E9E9;text-align:left;vertical-align:top;" |Candidate
! style="background-color:#E9E9E9;text-align:left;vertical-align:top;" |Party
! style="background-color:#E9E9E9;text-align:right;" |Votes
! style="background-color:#E9E9E9;text-align:right;" |%
|-
|style="background-color:"|
|align=left|Renat Layshev
|align=left|Independent
|
|36.89%
|-
|style="background-color:"|
|align=left|Sergey Vasilyev
|align=left|A Just Russia
|
|22.98%
|-
|style="background-color:"|
|align=left|Olga Anokhina
|align=left|Communist Party
|
|17.93%
|-
|style="background-color:"|
|align=left|Valery Borshchyov
|align=left|Yabloko
|
|14.52%
|-
|style="background-color:"|
|align=left|Arseny Ustinov
|align=left|Independent
|
|3.02%
|-
|style="background-color:"|
|align=left|Sergey Parashchenko
|align=left|Liberal Democratic Party
|
|2.33%
|-
| colspan="5" style="background-color:#E9E9E9;"|
|- style="font-weight:bold"
| colspan="3" style="text-align:left;" | Total
| 
| 100%
|-
| colspan="5" style="background-color:#E9E9E9;"|
|- style="font-weight:bold"
| colspan="4" |Source:
|
|}

2019

|-
! colspan=2 style="background-color:#E9E9E9;text-align:left;vertical-align:top;" |Candidate
! style="background-color:#E9E9E9;text-align:left;vertical-align:top;" |Party
! style="background-color:#E9E9E9;text-align:right;" |Votes
! style="background-color:#E9E9E9;text-align:right;" |%
|-
|style="background-color:"|
|align=left|Natalia Metlina
|align=left|Independent
|
|35.03%
|-
|style="background-color:"|
|align=left|Sergey Vasilyev
|align=left|A Just Russia
|
|28.36%
|-
|style="background-color:"|
|align=left|Dmitry Agranovsky
|align=left|Communist Party
|
|11.83%
|-
|style="background-color:"|
|align=left|Vladimir Ryazanov
|align=left|Communists of Russia
|
|7.97%
|-
|style="background-color:"|
|align=left|Sergey Malakhov
|align=left|Independent
|
|7.56%
|-
|style="background-color:"|
|align=left|Mikhail Monakhov
|align=left|Liberal Democratic Party
|
|5.81%
|-
| colspan="5" style="background-color:#E9E9E9;"|
|- style="font-weight:bold"
| colspan="3" style="text-align:left;" | Total
| 
| 100%
|-
| colspan="5" style="background-color:#E9E9E9;"|
|- style="font-weight:bold"
| colspan="4" |Source:
|
|}

Notes

References

Moscow City Duma districts